USS Asphalt (IX-153), a  designated an unclassified miscellaneous vessel, was the only ship of the United States Navy to be named for asphalt.  Her keel was laid down in 1944 at San Francisco, California, by Barrett & Hilp, Belair Shipyards. She was acquired by the Navy on 30 June 1944 through the Maritime Commission and was placed in service that same day.

Service history
Assigned to the Service Force, Pacific Fleet, as a floating provisions storage facility, she spent her brief career at forward bases, for the most part at Saipan, as a unit of Service Squadron 10. When a storm struck the anchorage at Saipan on 6 October 1944, Asphalts anchor chains parted, and she was driven hard aground on a coral reef. The barge was then declared a total loss. After her cargo and machinery were salvaged, she was abandoned. Her name was struck from the Naval Vessel Register on 23 February 1945.

References

External links
 

 

Trefoil-class concrete barges
Ships built in San Francisco
Shipwrecks of the Northern Mariana Islands coast
1944 ships